Lewis Island is a small rocky island rising to , marking the east side of the entrance to Davis Bay in Antarctica. It was delineated from air photos taken by U.S. Navy Operation Highjump (1946–47) and named by the Advisory Committee on Antarctic Names for James B. Lewis, Passed Midshipman on the sloop Peacock of the U.S. Exploring Expedition (1838–42) under Charles Wilkes.

See also
Lewis Island (disambiguation)

References

Islands of Wilkes Land